The Government Medical College, Srinagar (Urdu: ,; also known as GMC Srinagar) is a government medical college and hospital located in Srinagar, Jammu and Kashmir, India. It was established in 1959. It is the oldest medical college in Kashmir. The college and hospital are affiliated with the University of Kashmir and recognized by the Medical Council of India (currently National Medical Commission). It has well-equipped labs. The selection to the college is done on the basis of merit through National Eligibility and Entrance Test.

Associated hospitals
Currently there are eight associated hospitals of Government Medical College, Srinagar:

 SMHS (Sri Maharaja Hari Singh Hospital), also Known as Sadar Haspataal or Headwun
 G.B Pant, Children Hospital, Sonwar Srinagar (Bache Haspataal)
 Lal Ded Maternity Hospital, Hazuri Bag Srinagar (LD Haspataal)
 Psychiatric Diseases Hospital, Srinagar (Mental Haspataal)
 Chest Diseases Hospital Dalgate, Srinagar (Drokjan Haspataal)
 Bone and Joint Hospital Barzulla, Srinagar 
 Chitranjan Mobile Hospital
 Superspeciality Hospital, Shireen Bagh

Alumni and faculty
 Rafiq Ahmad Pampori (former principal)

References 

Educational institutions established in 1959
1959 establishments in Jammu and Kashmir
Kashmir
Srinagar district
Medical colleges in Jammu and Kashmir